Mercaston is a hamlet in Derbyshire, England. It is located in the Peak District 7 miles west of Duffield. It is in the civil parish of Hulland Ward.

See also
Listed buildings in Mercaston

References

External links

Hamlets in Derbyshire
Derbyshire Dales